Spain is a sovereign state in southwestern Europe.

Spain may also refer to:

Places and politics
Spain (European Parliament constituency)
Francoist Spain, known as the Spanish State, the government of Spain under Francisco Franco
Spain, South Dakota, an unincorporated community in the United States
Port of Spain, the capital of Trinidad and Tobago
Spain was used in the Middle Ages to refer to the whole of the  Iberian Peninsula (e.g. Emperor of all Spain)

Music
Spain (band), a 1990s American jazz-rock band
Spain (Between the Trees album), 2009
Spain (Michel Camilo and Tomatito album), 2000
Spain (instrumental), a 1971 instrumental jazz fusion composition by Chick Corea
"Spain" (John Paul Young song), 1986
"Spain", a song by Blonde Redhead from their 2010 album Penny Sparkle

Other uses
Spain (horse), an American Thoroughbred racehorse
Spain (Auden), a poem by W. H. Auden 
Spain Rodriguez (1940–2012), American cartoonist
Spain (surname), a surname (including a list of people with the name)
Spain, the national personification in the webmanga series Hetalia: Axis Powers

See also
España (disambiguation)
Spanish (disambiguation)